Scatterbrain was an American eclectic thrash metal band founded in 1989 by Tommy Christ and Glen Cummings, after their Long Island, New York hardcore group Ludichrist broke up.

The band performed distinctive live shows in which they would incorporate a Mozart medley mixed with Motörhead, cross-dressing, and giant chickens.

Their most popular single "Don't Call Me Dude" was a top-twenty pop single in Australia. The video received regular rotation on MTV's Headbangers Ball. The story line in the video is based on guitarist Dude Aeronomy who, in the late 1980s, began to react as depicted in the video. The same video is also featured in the episode "Blood Drive" on MTV's Beavis and Butt-Head.

The band contributed a cover of LL Cool J's "Mama Said Knock You Out" to the soundtrack of the 1992 movie Encino Man.

In 1993, Cummings parted ways with the others and moved to Nashville, founding the group Stone Deep. Christ, Neider, Brogna and Boyko wrote and released Scatterbrain's third release, a seven-song EP titled Mundus Intellectualis (1994). The band stopped writing, recording, and touring altogether in 1994.

In 2007, Christ, Neider, Brogna and Ludichrist drummer Dave Miranda reunited to perform several Scatterbrain / Ludichrist reunion shows. Cummings did not participate.

Discography

Studio albums

Live albums

Extended plays

Charting singles

References

External links
 Scatterbrain MySpace page
 Tommy Christ website

American funk metal musical groups
Heavy metal musical groups from New York (state)
Musical groups established in 1989
Musical groups disestablished in 1995
Comedy rock musical groups